Leroy M. Washburn (February 12, 1847 - 1939) was a member of the Wisconsin State Assembly.

Biography
Washburn was born on February 12, 1847, in Dover, Maine. Later, he married Ruth Lawrence. Washburn was a merchant by trade. He died in 1939.

Political career
Washburn was a member of the Assembly during the 1876 session. Other positions he held include Chairman of the town board (similar to city council) of Sturgeon Bay (town), Wisconsin. He was a member of the Reform Party.

References

External links

People from Dover-Foxcroft, Maine
People from Sturgeon Bay, Wisconsin
Members of the Wisconsin State Assembly
Wisconsin city council members
Wisconsin Reformers (19th century)
19th-century American politicians
American merchants
1847 births
1939 deaths
Burials in Wisconsin